Piau is a municipality in Brazil. It may also refer to:

 Piau River, river in Brazil
 Sandrine Piau (born 1965), French soprano